Haika Grossman (20 November 1919 – 26 May 1996) was an Israeli politician and member of Knesset. In her youth, she was a Zionist leader in Europe, a partisan, and a participant in the ghetto uprisings in occupied Poland.

Grossman was born in Białystok, Poland. As a teenager she joined the HaShomer HaTzair Socialist-Zionist youth movement. As a leader of the movement in Poland, she was sent to the town of Brześć Litewski to organize the movement's activities there and in the surrounding region.

When World War II erupted, she moved to Wilno (now Vilnius, Lithuania), where she was active in the emergency underground leadership of HaShomer HaTzair. Upon the Nazi invasion of the Soviet Union in 1941, she returned to Białystok, where she helped organize the underground movement in the Białystok Ghetto. She served as a courier between that ghetto and those of Wilno, Lublin, Warsaw and others. Using forged papers, she managed to pass as a Polish woman named Halina Woranowicz. Her Polish identity enabled her to assist the underground movements in numerous towns and ghettoes, as well as the emerging partisan units being formed in the nearby forests of Poland and Lithuania. Aided by Otto Busse she also purchased arms and helped smuggle them into the ghettoes. In 1943, she took part in the Białystok Ghetto Uprising, and helped to establish an underground unit.

After the war, Grossman served on the Central Committee of the Jews of Poland, and was awarded medal for outstanding heroism. She emigrated to Mandatory Palestine in 1948 and joined Kibbutz Evron in the Western Galilee. She also served in various capacities in the Mapam Party. From 1950 to 1951 she was the head of Ga'aton Regional Council.

From 1969 to 1988 (aside from a break between 1981 and 1984), Grossman was a member of Knesset for Mapam and the Alignment (an alliance which Mapam was part of). As a parliamentarian, she focused on social issues and the status of women. Among the laws she helped pass were the right to abortions, laws relating to at-risk youth, and the law against beating children.

In 1993, Grossman was invited to light one of twelve torches traditionally kindled in the national ceremony marking Yom Ha'atzma'ut (Israel's Independence Day). Later, at a party for the torch lighters, she slipped down a flight of stairs and fell into a coma, which lasted three years, until her death in 1996.

References

Notes
Israel Gutman, Encyclopaedia of the Holocaust, New York: Macmillan, 1990, vol. 2. pp. 621–622. Photo
Memorial site

Book
Grossman, Haika.  The Underground Army:  Fighters of the Bialystak Ghetto, Holocaust Library, 426pp.; 1988.

External links
Memorial website

English and Hebrew Memorial website

1919 births
1996 deaths
20th-century Israeli women politicians
Alignment (Israel) politicians
Białystok Ghetto inmates
Deputy Speakers of the Knesset
Hashomer Hatzair members
20th-century Israeli Jews
Israeli people of Polish-Jewish descent
Jewish Israeli politicians
Jewish partisans
Jewish women politicians
Jews in Mandatory Palestine
Kibbutzniks
Mapam politicians
Members of the 7th Knesset (1969–1974)
Members of the 8th Knesset (1974–1977)
Members of the 9th Knesset (1977–1981)
Members of the 11th Knesset (1984–1988)
Polish emigrants to Mandatory Palestine
Polish resistance members of World War II
Polish women in World War II resistance
Polish Zionists
Women members of the Knesset
Zionist activists